Aerosynchro Aviation (former  IBA International Business Air) is an airline based in Karlshamn, Sweden. It operates on-demand passenger charter and cargo flights in Europe, Africa and Asia. Its main bases are Stockholm-Arlanda Airport and Stockholm-Bromma Airport.

History 
The airline was established as IBA (International Business Air) and started operations in 1983 as an air-taxi operator with Piper PA-31 Navajo aircraft. It expanded to operate charter, cargo and scheduled services, although the latter were terminated in 2001. It has 22 employees (at March 2007). It was renamed in 2007.

Fleet 

The International Business Air fleet includes the following aircraft (at March 2015): No aircraft is certified as airworthy anymore. The last certificate to expire was that of SE-LIL, which expired on December 31, 2008.

1 Embraer EMB 120ER Brasilia SE-LKC
1 Fairchild Metro III SE-LIL

References

External links 

International Business Air

Defunct airlines of Sweden
Airlines established in 1983
Swedish companies established in 1983
Charter airlines
Airlines disestablished in 2007